Michel Picard may refer to:

 Michel Picard (canoeist) (born 1934), French canoer
 Michel Picard (ice hockey) (born 1969), NHL player
 Michel Picard (politician) (born 1960), Canadian politician
 Michel Picard (rower) (born 1954), French lightweight rower
 Michel Picard (writer) (born 1931), French writer